Andrew Spade (born May 5, 1962) is an American businessman. He co-founded the fashion brand Kate Spade New York with his wife, Kate Spade, as well as the design company Partners & Spade.

Early life and education
Spade was born in Michigan, the middle child in a family of three brothers. His younger brother is actor and comedian David Spade. The family moved to Arizona when Andy Spade was 6. He attended Arizona State University, where he met his future wife. During college, he and a friend founded the advertising firm Spade & Hannawell, which was named one of Arizona's Top 10 New Companies in 1987.

Career 
Spade started his career in advertising working on brands including Coca-Cola, Lexus, and Paul Stuart before leaving his job in 1996 to join his wife's business.

Fashion 
In 1993, he and his wife founded the fashion and lifestyle brand Kate Spade New York and in 1999, the men's brand Jack Spade. Under his leadership, 26 Kate Spade stores were opened in North America and Japan.

In 2008, he established Partners & Spade, a storefront and studio on Lafayette Street in the NoHo neighborhood of lower Manhattan.

In 2013, he launched a collection of loungewear, Sleepy Jones, with Anthony Sperduti and Chad Buri.

Other endeavors 
Along with launching Partners & Spade, he produced feature films with Red Bucket Films and is conceiving and publishing books through HarperCollins.

Personal life 
Spade was married to designer Kate Brosnahan (known professionally as Kate Spade) from 1994 until her death on June 5, 2018. They had one child, Frances Beatrix Spade, born in February 2005. The actress Rachel Brosnahan is Spade's niece by marriage.

At the time of Kate's death by suicide, Andy released a statement acknowledging that the couple had been living separately, but close to each other, for the previous ten months, though they were not legally separated. Their daughter, then 13, lived with both of them. The statement said that Kate "suffered from depression and anxiety for many years" but had been seeking medical treatment.

Awards 
He was named one of 100 creative business people of 2009 by Fast Company.

He was honored by the CFDA for excellence in design.

References

External links 
 Partners & Spade

American marketing people
Living people
Arizona State University alumni
People from Michigan
1962 births